Graham McTavish (born 4 January 1961) is a Scottish actor and author. He is known for his roles as Dwalin in The Hobbit film trilogy, Vlad Dracula Țepeș in the Netflix animated franchise Castlevania, Loki in various Marvel animated projects, William Munny, the Saint of Killers in the AMC series Preacher, and as Dougal MacKenzie and William Buccleigh MacKenzie in the Starz series Outlander. He is also known for his roles in the video game franchise Uncharted as the main antagonist Zoran Lazarević in Uncharted 2: Among Thieves and Charlie Cutter in Uncharted 3: Drake's Deception.

In 2020, McTavish and Outlander co-star Sam Heughan co-wrote Clanlands: Whisky, Warfare, and a Scottish Adventure Like No Other, which hit No. 1 on the New York Times' Best Seller Lists for hardcover nonfiction and for combined print and e-book nonfiction. 

In January 2023, McTavish married Garance Doré, at Borthwick Castle in Scotland.

Early life
McTavish was born in Glasgow, Scotland. He is the son of Alec and Ellen McTavish. The family, especially his father, was politically active, and political discourse was common in their household. His family left Glasgow when McTavish was a child, and throughout his adult life, he has lived in places such as Canada, the United States, and England before settling in New Zealand. During school, McTavish and a friend would write and perform comedy sketches, which led to his drama teacher asking him to step in to cover a role in Sheridan's The Rivals after the principal actor became ill. He went on to attend Queen Mary University of London, earning a degree in English literature. This degree course allowed him to perform in three Shakespeare plays per year while at school, and led to McTavish earning his Equity card after performing in a play by Samuel Beckett.

Career
Early in his career, McTavish did theatre work with the repertory theatres of London's West End and at the Dundee Rep with colleagues that included Jimmy Logan and Robert Robertson.

Television
McTavish's first professional role, in 1986, was in episode two of Walt Disney's mini-series Return to Treasure Island. He next featured in 1988's Freedom Fighter (aka Wall of Tyranny), which was broadcast on ITV and starred Tony Danza as a man who helped those living in East Berlin cross the Berlin Wall. Popular fantasy-adventure series Highlander, which centered on an immortal man tasked with fighting evil, saw McTavish in the series four episode "Judgment Day" in 1996 and TV movie Merlin saw him co-star as Rengal in 1998. Between 1998 and 1999, he went on to appear in several episodic television series including a three-part episode of ITV's Glasgow based crime drama Taggart, BBC One medical drama Casualty, BBC Two's sci-fi sitcom Red Dwarf, and ITV's police drama Heartbeat.

In 2000, McTavish guest-starred in ITV's mini-series The Stretch, a two-part crime drama centering on crime boss Terry Green and his wife Sam. The next year guest-starred on a series two episode of BBC One's long-running medical drama Doctors. In 2002, he had guest spots on BBC One's comedy Celeb, ITV's crime drama Rose & Maloney, and ABC's fantasy mini-series Dinotopia. The following year he featured in an episode of ITV's mystery drama Rosemary & Thyme, three episodes of ITV's gangster drama Family, and two episodes of BBC's mini-series The Last King (aka Charles II: The Power and the Passion). BBC's crime drama Murphy's Law (2004), a serial revolving around an undercover police officer in London, saw McTavish guest-star in the series two episode "Bent Moon on the Rise", followed by a turn as Captain James Stagg in BBC's made for TV Film D-Day 6 June 1944.

McTavish returned to the crime drama Taggart in 2005's episode "Mind Over Matter" and to medical drama Casualty in the series nineteen episode "Baby Love". That same year he was cast in two separate series based upon events from the rise of the Roman Empire. First was a five episode role as General Rapax in ABC's mini-series Empire, which chronicled Octavius, who would become Emperor Augustus. Second was a two-episode stint as Urbo in HBO's Golden Globe nominated series Rome. He went on to a recurring role in ITV's police procedural drama The Bill. McTavish finished out the year by starring in two made for TV movies, Good Girl, Bad Girl, the story of a set of twins who tangle with a drug dealer, and Sharpe's Challenge, a drama surrounding a British Soldier (Sean Bean) during the Napoleonic Wars.

2007 saw McTavish feature in numerous episodic television productions. He portrayed The Dark Spirit in a three episode guest appearance on CBS's web series Ghost Whisperer: The Other Side, which explored the world through the ghost's perspective. The series is a spin-off of their supernatural series Ghost Whisperer. From there he had guest appearances in BBC One's dramas Jekyll and New Tricks, ITV's medical drama The Royal, CBS's FBI centered drama Numb3rs, police procedural NCIS, and family drama Cane. The next year he landed the role of Ferguson in the fourth season of Fox's popular drama Prison Break. In the fourth season of ABC's hit science fiction series Lost, McTavish guest starred as Desmond's drill sergeant. He also appeared in ABC's supernatural thriller Pushing Daisies and CBS's crime drama CSI: Miami. In 2009, McTavish returned to CBS for a guest starring role, opposite Jennifer Love Hewitt, in the supernatural drama Ghost Whisperer.

McTavish portrayed Russian foreign minister Mikhail Novakovich in a seven episode stint on Fox's hit series 24 in 2010. He went on to appear in an episode of Fox's action comedy series The Good Guys, which revolves around two detectives stuck solving small crimes. In September 2013, it was announced that he had been cast as Dougal MacKenzie, war chief of the MacKenzie clan, in Starz's time-travel drama series Outlander. The series is an adaption of the bestselling novels by author Diana Gabaldon and premiered on 9 August 2014 to positive reviews from both critics and television audiences. McTavish would reprise the role throughout seasons one and two. In 2016, McTavish landed the recurring role of William Munny, the Saint of Killers in AMC's drama Preacher, which is based upon Garth Ennis and Steve Dillon's comic book series of the same name. 2018 saw McTavish feature in the recurring role of Andrew MacGregor in USA Network's science fiction series Colony, which explores earth after an alien attack. Season four of the Netflix drama Lucifer, with McTavish in the recurring role of Father Kinley, debuted in 2019. The series was based upon Neil Gaiman's Lucifer character from The Sandman comics.

MacTavish returned to Outlander in 2020, in a surprise appearance as William Buccleigh MacKenzie, the son of Dougal MacKenzie and Geillis Duncan (Lotte Verbeek). Later that year, he and Outlander co-star Sam Heughan announced that STARZ had ordered eight episodes of their travel documentary Men in Kilts: A Roadtrip With Sam and Graham, which premiered in February 2021. It was announced in March 2021 that McTavish had joined the cast of Netflix's fantasy drama The Witcher, based upon author Andrzej Sapkowski's book series, as master spy and Redanian Intelligence head Sigismund Dijkstra.

Film
For Queen and Country (1988), a social drama from director Martin Stellman, featured McTavish opposite Denzel Washington in his first professional film role. The next year he had a small part in Terry Jones' mythological comedy Erik the Viking, which was written and performed in the style of a Monty Python film. Working once again with Jones, McTavish portrayed a drunken weasel in 1996's Mr. Toad's Wild Ride, an adaptation of Kenneth Grahame's children's classic The Wind in the Willows. He went on to star in director Jeremy Freeston's 1997 adaptation of Shakespeare's Macbeth, opposite Jason Connery. McTavish performed in two documentaries on Shakespearean works in 1997. The first was Cromwell Productions' King Lear: A Critical Guide, where he portrayed Albany. Second was Julius Caesar: A Critical Guide, where he portrayed Brutus. He continued with Shakespeare in 1999 by portraying the Duke of Albany in King Lear, opposite Brian Blessed.

McTavish's next feature film was 2002's Ali G Indahouse, where he portrayed a customs officer, followed by 2003's Dot the i, where he portrayed a detective opposite Tom Hardy. He went on to portray a submarine captain in director Jan de Bont's Lara CroftTomb Raider: The Cradle of Life. The next year he was featured in Buena Vista Pictures' action adventure film King Arthur. In 2008, McTavish starred opposite Sylvester Stallone in Rambo, the fourth film in the franchise based upon David Morrell's 1972 novel First Blood. His next film, director Richard Wellings-Thomas' comedy Sisterhood, saw McTavish in the role of Martin. 2009 saw several film roles for McTavish, including prison drama Green Street 2, independent horror film Penance, Jason Connery's thriller Pandemic, and the dramatic comedy Middle Men, opposite Luke Wilson.

In 2010, McTavish had a supporting role in Disney's Secretariat, based upon the true story of Penny Chenery and the racehorse who would win the first American Triple Crown in twenty-five years. He would go on to feature in The Wicker Tree (2011), Robin Hardy's sequel to his 1973 film The Wicker Man, and Sony Pictures' action film Colombiana, opposite Zoe Saldana. Between 2012 and 2014, he portrayed the dwarf Dwalin in director Peter Jackson's Empire Award-winning The Hobbit trilogy. McTavish completed 2014 with a supporting role in the action adventure film Plastic, opposite Ed Speleers, and director Jonathan King's independent sci-fi thriller REALITi. The next year he portrayed Ricky Conlan (Tony Bellew)'s boxing trainer Tommy Holiday in Creed, the seventh film in the Rocky franchise.

Disney's The Finest Hours, based upon the true story of a daring Coast Guard rescue in 1952, saw McTavish co-star opposite Chris Pine and Eric Bana in 2016. He then appeared, as himself, in director Yaniv Rokah's documentary Queen Mimi, which recounted the life of a homeless woman in Santa Monica, California. In 2017, McTavish starred in director Niall Johnson's western thriller The Stolen, followed by a cameo as King Atlan in the DC Comics/Warner Brothers film Aquaman. Director Adam Sigal's independent film Sargasso saw McTavish in a starring role in early 2019. Later that same year, it was announced that McTavish would star, opposite Anne Heche, in Specter Pictures' upcoming horror thriller Chasing Nightmares.

McTavish is currently working on his directoral debut, titled This Guest of Summer, which was partially funded through IndieGoGo, a crowd funding platform. Besides directing, he will also star in the film alongside fellow Outlander alumni Stephen Walters and Duncan Lacroix and fellow Hobbit alumni Dean O'Gorman and Adam Brown.

Voice work
McTavish has done extensive voice work in animated series, films and video games.

Animation and films
McTavish's first voice work was in the recurring role of Sebastian Shaw in Nicktoons' 2009 animated Marvel Comics series Wolverine and the X-Men. McTavish continued in the Marvel Universe by portraying the villain Loki in the direct-to-video animated feature Hulk Versus and Disney XD's animated series The Avengers: Earth's Mightiest Heroes. In 2010, he portrayed the lead role of Dante in Dante's Infero: An Animated Epic, opposite Mark Hamill. The direct-to-video feature was a companion piece to Electronic Arts' video game Dante's Inferno, which was based upon Dante Alighieri's fourteenth century epic poem Divine Comedy.

2011 saw McTavish feature in director Mike Disa's direct-to-video sci-fi animated feature Dead Space: Aftermath in the role of Captain Caleb Campbell. From there, between 2015 and 2017, he had a recurring voice role in Nickelodeon's animated series Teenage Mutant Ninja Turtles and a guest spot in an episode of Kung Fu Panda: Legends of Awesomeness (2016). McTavish would go on to feature in Cartoon Network's animated series Transformers: Robots in Disguise, in the dual roles of Titus and Vernon, while he appeared as the voice of Fergus McDuck, father of Scrooge McDuck, in the 2017 DuckTales animated series episode "The Secret(s) of Castle McDuck!" McTavish currently stars as Dracula in Netflix's animated series Castlevania, an adaptation of Konami's Gothic horror video game series.

Video games
Guerrilla Games' action game Killzone: Liberation (2006), a sequel to its popular game Killzone, was McTavish's first professional voice role in video games. He would go on, in 2009, to portray Commander Lucius in Epic Games' Shadow Complex, Crimson in Tecmo Koei's Ninja Gaiden Sigma 2, Arl Eamon Guerrin in BioWare's Dragon Age: Origins, Archer in Activision's Call of Duty: Modern Warfare 2, and Wilcox in Electronic Arts' The Saboteur. McTavish also provided both the voice and motion capture work for the main antagonist Zoran Lazarević in action-adventure game Uncharted 2: Among Thieves. The next year he provided the voice of the main protagonist Dante Alighieri in Dante's Inferno, Khan in Metro 2033, the Decepticon Thundercracker in Transformers: War for Cybertron, and Viktor Barisov in Activision's Singularity.

In 2011, McTavish provided the voices of antagonist Joseph Bertrand III in Infamous 2, an imperial guardsman in Warhammer 40,000: Dawn of War II – Retribution, a ClawHammer soldier in SOCOM 4: U.S. Navy SEALs, Caddoc in Hunted: The Demon's Forge, and Ivan Stagleishov in Ace Combat: Assault Horizon. McTavish also provided both the voice and motion capture work for Charlie Cutter in Uncharted 3: Drake's Deception. He would reprise this role in 2016's Uncharted 4: A Thief's End after voicing Sebastian Malory/Sir Percival in 2015's third-person action-adventure game The Order: 1886.

McTavish has also provided additional voices for Medieval II: Total War, Heavenly Sword, 007: Quantum of Solace, Call of Duty: Modern Warfare: Mobilized, Call of Duty: Black Ops, and Star Wars: The Old Republic.

Writing
In 2020, McTavish and fellow Outlander actor Sam Heughan published a book entitled Clanlands: Whisky, Warfare, and a Scottish Adventure Like No Other, which was inspired by their work on the upcoming STARZ docu-series Men in Kilts. The book reached the #1 spot on the New York Times' Best Seller Lists for hardcover nonfiction and for combined print and e-book nonfiction, and also hit No. 1 on the Publishers Weekly Bestseller List for hardcover nonfiction, among other lists.

In April 2015, McTavish was the 17th grand marshall of New York City's Tartan Day Parade.

Filmography

Film

Television

Video games

Written works by McTavish
 Clanlands: Whisky, Warfare, and a Scottish Adventure Like No Other (2020)

Awards and nominations

References

External links
 
 

Living people
Scottish male film actors
Scottish male television actors
Scottish male video game actors
Scottish male voice actors
20th-century Scottish male actors
21st-century Scottish male actors
1961 births